Ekels is a surname. Notable people with the surname include:

John Ekels (born 1940), Canadian sailor
Jan Ekels the Younger (1759–1793), Dutch painter
Jan Ekels the Elder (1724–1781), Dutch painter

See also
 Eckels
 Eccles (disambiguation)